Paul Nardi (born 18 May 1994) is a French professional footballer who plays as a goalkeeper for Belgian First Division A club Gent.

Career

Nancy
Nardi is a youth exponent from AS Nancy. He made his Ligue 2 debut at 13 September 2013 against US Créteil-Lusitanos. He never left the starting eleven since then.

Lorient
On 23 July 2019, Nardi joined Lorient on a four-year deal.

Gent
On 31 August 2022, Nardi joined Belgian First Division A club Gent on a two-year deal.

Career statistics

Club

Honours
Individual
Toulon Tournament Best Goalkeeper: 2014

References

Anthony Ribelin (Montpellier) et Paul Nardi (Monaco) à Rennes (officiel)‚ lequipe.fr, 21 June 2016

External links
 
 

1994 births
Living people
Sportspeople from Vesoul
French footballers
Footballers from Bourgogne-Franche-Comté
Association football goalkeepers
France youth international footballers
France under-21 international footballers
AS Nancy Lorraine players
AS Monaco FC players
Stade Rennais F.C. players
Cercle Brugge K.S.V. players
FC Lorient players
K.A.A. Gent players
Ligue 1 players
Ligue 2 players
Championnat National 2 players
Belgian Pro League players
Challenger Pro League players
French expatriate footballers
French expatriate sportspeople in Monaco
Expatriate footballers in Monaco
French expatriate sportspeople in Belgium
Expatriate footballers in Belgium